André Klippenberg Grindheim (born 7 April 2000) is a Norwegian swimmer, born in Haugesund. He qualified to represent Norway at the 2020 Summer Olympics in Tokyo 2021, competing in men's 100 metre breaststroke.

References

External links
 
 
 
 

2000 births
Living people
People from Haugesund
Norwegian male breaststroke swimmers
Swimmers at the 2020 Summer Olympics
Olympic swimmers of Norway
Swimmers at the 2018 Summer Youth Olympics
Sportspeople from Rogaland